Filip Ditzel (born ) is a Czech male  track cyclist. He competed in three events at the 2012 UCI Track Cycling World Championships.

References

External links
 Profile at cyclingarchives.com

1985 births
Living people
Czech track cyclists
Czech male cyclists
Place of birth missing (living people)